A church porch is a room-like structure at a church's main entrance. A porch protects from the weather to some extent.  Some porches have an outer door, others a simple gate, and in some cases the outer opening is not closed in any way.

The porch at St Wulfram's Church, Grantham, like many others of the period, has a room above the porch. It once provided lodging for the priest, but now houses the Francis Trigge Chained Library. Such a room is sometimes called a parvise which spelt as parvis normally means an open space or colonnade in front of a church entrance.

In Scandinavia and Germany the porch of a church is often called by names meaning weaponhouse. It used to be believed that visitors stored their weapons there because of a prohibition against carrying weapons into the sanctuary, or into houses in general; this is now considered apocryphal by most accepted sources, and the weaponhouse is considered more likely to have functioned as a guardroom or armoury to store weapons in case of need.

Examples

See also
 Lychgate

References

External links
 

Church architecture
Rooms